Dan Dunn was the first fictional character to appear in an American comic book.

Dan Dunn may also refer to:

Dan Dunn (painter), American improvisational artist
Dan Dunn (writer) (born 1968), American comedy writer